123 Albert Street is a commercial office development in Brisbane, Australia. The modern style office building is located in the Brisbane central business district at 123 Albert Street. The building was completed in July 2011 and opened in October 2011.

The Premium grade office tower was designed by Hassell and is owned by Dexus. The tower consists of 26 levels of office space and eight levels of car parking (five above ground) which provide 388 car park spaces. The building has a two design ratings: a 6 Green Star rating and a 5 Star Australian Building Greenhouse Rating which are pending assessment.

On 25 August 2010 a worker was injured during the construction of the tower.

The building was the first in Brisbane to employ a commercial concierge.

See also

List of tallest buildings in Brisbane

References

External links
Building website

Skyscrapers in Brisbane
Office buildings in Brisbane
Office buildings completed in 2011
2011 establishments in Australia
Albert Street, Brisbane
Skyscraper office buildings in Australia